The Lacepede Channel separates the Lacepede Islands from the Dampier Peninsula in north-west Western Australia. It is nominally located at 16° 55' S 122° 13' E.

References

Coastline of Western Australia